Meenakshi Natarajan (born 23 July 1973) is an Indian politician and former Member of Parliament from Mandsaur from 2009 to 2014, her single term in parliament.

Background
Meenakshi Natarajan was born in Birlagram Nagda, Ujjain in Madhya Pradesh.  She is a post graduate in Biochemistry and has a bachelor's degree in Law. She completed her study in Indore Madhya Pradesh from Devi Ahilya University. Ratlam was the Place where she started her political career right joining after NSUI.
She is writer of "1857-Bhartiya paripeksh" 
"Apne-Apne Kurukshetra" is her popular novel.

Political career

Organisational roles
She worked as NSUI President from 1999–2002. She also worked as President Madhya Pradesh Youth Congress from 2002-2005 and was selected by Rahul Gandhi as AICC Secretary in 2008.

2009 Elections
She was selected by Rahul Gandhi for contesting from Mandsaur, Madhya Pradesh in 2009 Indian general election which she won by over 30,000 votes defeating her BJP opponent Laxminarayan Pandey who had been winning since 1971. She had coined the slogan "Pradesh elections".

She has served as a Member of the Committee on Personnel, Public Grievances, Law and Justice and that of the Committee on Empowerment of Women.

2014 Elections 
She was defeated by Sudhir Gupta of the Bharatiya Janata Party (BJP) from the Mandsaur constituency in Madhya Pradesh by a margin of over 300,000 votes. She had emerged as a 'consensus candidate' through the primary, which is piloted by Congress vice-president Rahul Gandhi. Her opponent Surendra Sethi has alleged that the primary was rigged.

2019 Elections
She contested the Mandsaur seat again in 2019 Indian general election but lost to Sudhir Gupta in a repeat of 2014 result.

Controversy
During one of the election rally, her party's spokesperson Digvijaya Singh referred her as "sau taka tunch maal" (100% pure item/material) while introducing her on the stage.

References

Indian National Congress politicians from Madhya Pradesh
India MPs 2009–2014
Women in Madhya Pradesh politics
1973 births
Living people
People from Mandsaur
Lok Sabha members from Madhya Pradesh
United Progressive Alliance candidates in the 2014 Indian general election
People from Ujjain district
21st-century Indian women politicians
21st-century Indian politicians